Jean H. Leroux (born 6 February 1949) was a member of the House of Commons of Canada from 1993 to 1997. Born in Granby, Quebec, he is a teacher by career.

He was elected in the Shefford electoral district under the Bloc Québécois party in the 1993 federal election, thus he served in the 35th Canadian Parliament. He was defeated by Progressive Conservative candidate Diane St-Jacques in the 1997 federal election and left Canadian politics after that.

External links
 

1949 births
Bloc Québécois MPs
Living people
Members of the House of Commons of Canada from Quebec
People from Granby, Quebec